New Democracy, or the New Democratic Revolution, is a concept based on Mao Zedong's Bloc of Four Social Classes theory in post-revolutionary China which argued originally that democracy in China would take a path that was decisively distinct from that in any other country. He also said every colonial or semi-colonial country would have its own unique path to democracy, given that particular country's own social and material conditions. Mao labeled representative democracy in the Western nations as Old Democracy, characterizing parliamentarianism as just an instrument to promote the dictatorship of the bourgeoisie/land-owning class through manufacturing consent. He also found his concept of New Democracy in contrast with the Soviet-style dictatorship of the proletariat which he assumed would be the dominant political structure of a post-capitalist world. Mao spoke about how he wanted to create a New China, a country freed from the feudal and semi-feudal aspects of its old culture as well as Japanese imperialism.

Mao wanted to create a new culture through Cultural Revolution, a new economy free from the land owners and in order to protect these new institutions, a New Democracy of the four revolutionary classes, namely the peasantry, proletariat, petite bourgeoisie and national bourgeoisie.  

Regarding the political structure of New Democracy, Mao said in Section V of his piece called "On New Democracy", written in January 1940, as follows:China may now adopt a system of people's congresses, from the national people's congress down to the provincial, county, district and township people's congresses, with all levels electing their respective governmental bodies. But if there is to be a proper representation for each revolutionary class according to its status in the state, a proper expression of the people's will, a proper direction for revolutionary struggles and a proper manifestation of the spirit of New Democracy, then a system of really universal and equal suffrage, irrespective of sex, creed, property or education, must be introduced. Such is the system of democratic centralism. Only a government based on democratic centralism can fully express the will of all the revolutionary people and fight the enemies of the revolution most effectively. There must be a spirit of refusal to be "privately owned by the few" in the government and the army; without a genuinely democratic system this cannot be attained and the system of government and the state system will be out of harmony.

As time passed, the New Democracy concept was adapted to other countries and regions with similar justifications.

Concept 
The concept of New Democracy aims to overthrow feudalism and achieve independence from colonialism. However, it dispenses with the rule predicted by Karl Marx that a capitalist class would usually follow such a struggle, claiming instead to seek to enter directly into socialism through a coalition of classes fighting the old ruling order. The coalition is subsumed under the leadership and guidance of the working class and its communist party, working with the communists irrespective of their competing ideologies in order to achieve the more immediate goal of a "new democratic order". Led by a communist party, a New Democracy allows for limited development of national capitalism as part of the effort to replace foreign imperialism and domestic feudalism.

The Chinese communists hoped that the working class in a similar fashion could then build full-blown socialism and communism in spite of the competing class interests of the social classes of the bloc. In the China, the application of the New Democracy concept resulted in the Communist Party of China's appeal to a coalition of the urban and rural poor, progressive intellectuals, and bourgeois "patriotic democrats," ultimately contributing to a successful revolution.

The bloc of classes reflecting the principles of New Democracy is symbolized most readily by the stars on the flag of China. The largest star symbolizes the Party's leadership and the surrounding four smaller stars symbolizing the Bloc of Four Classes, i.e. proletarian workers, peasants, the petty bourgeoisie (small business owners) and the nationally based capitalists. This is the coalition of classes for Mao's New Democratic Revolution as he described it in his works. Mao's New Democracy explains the Bloc of Four Classes as an unfortunate but necessary consequence of imperialism as described by Lenin.

Comparisons with core Marxism 
The classical Marxist understanding of the stages of economic and historical development of the modes of production under which a socialist revolution can take place is that the socialist revolution occurs only after the capitalist bourgeois-democratic revolution happens first. According to this, the bourgeois-democratic revolution paves the way for the industrial proletarian class to emerge as the majority class in society, after which it then overthrows capitalism and begins constructing socialism. Mao disagreed and said that the bourgeois-democratic revolution and the socialist revolution could be combined into a single stage, rather than two separate back-to-back stages. He called this stage New Democracy.

Marx himself is often misunderstood on this topic as he did not postulate that strictly only after a bourgeois society has formed, a socialist revolution would become possible. Instead, most notably in a letter to Vera Zasulich, Marx suggested a form of revolutionary change in Russia at the time that is very much akin to Mao's thesis of New Democracy: The class coalition of New Democracy is similar to the view of Vladimir Lenin, who had broken with the Mensheviks over the idea that the working class could organize and lead the democratic revolution in an underdeveloped country like Russia where the objective conditions for socialism did not yet exist. Nonetheless, the Chinese experience contrasts with the Bolshevik Revolution because it included, rather than targeted, the national bourgeoisie (the bourgeois class of a semi-colonial country).

Effects of establishment 
Once New Democracy has been established in the way Mao's theory outlines, the country is subsequently claimed to be ideologically socialist and working towards communism under the leadership of its leading communist party and its people are actively involved in the construction of socialism. Examples are the Great Leap Forward and the Cultural Revolution for what Mao viewed as the participatory democracy inherent in the New Democracy concept.

Because of New Democracy's nature as an "intermediate stage", it is considered a stepping-stone to socialism—an essentially two-stage theory of first New Democracy, then socialism, given that the self-proclaimed ultimate goal of socialist construction—the creation of a stateless, classless and moneyless communist society—has not yet been reached in the period of New Democracy.

Examples 
Currently, the Shining Path, the New People's Army of the Philippines, and the Communist Party of India (Maoist) pursue similar actions pursuant to similar ideas, conducting active guerrilla warfare (people's war) with the intent of establishing New Democracy. In 2006, the Unified Communist Party of Nepal (Maoist) entered the government of Nepal using similar New Democratic reasoning and methods. However, it was expelled from the coalition in 2009 and its leader (who had been elected Prime Minister) was deposed, so since then the CPN(M) has oscillated between threatening to return to armed struggle and leading general strikes in Nepal using its still-considerable influence in the Nepalese labor movement.

Some have argued that the Fast Track Land Reform Program in Zimbabwe represents the culmination of New Democracy there and these same people usually also say that ZANU-PF remains a genuinely socialist party.

Criticism 
Some criticize New Democracy as class collaborationism or as a stage to replace the dictatorship of the proletariat, but Mao completely rejected this by saying:

See also 
 Maoism
 Marxism
 People's War
 Permanent revolution
 Theory of the productive forces
 Soviet democracy

References

Further reading 

 
 Stuart R. Schram, ed., Mao's road to power: revolutionary writings 1912-1949 Vol VII New Democracy, 1939-1941 (Armonk, NY: Sharpe, 2005) pp. 330–369. Translation of the full text, based on 1943 edition, with notes.
 "New Democratic Politics and New Democratic Culture (Excerpts)", in Tony Saich, Ed. The Rise to Power of the Chinese Communist Party (Armonk, New York: 1996) 912–929. 
 Vincent Sherman (2011). New Democracy & ZANU-PF: Zimbabwe's Revolutionary Path, Return to the Source.

Chinese democracy movements
Cold War history of China
Ideology of the Chinese Communist Party
Maoism
Political theories